Johan Magnus Almqvist (September 6, 1799 – October 9, 1873) was a Swedish theologian and parliamentarian. He was born in Stockholm, Sweden. He became a member of the Order of the Polar Star a Swedish order of chivalry in 1862.

He married Fredrika Eneström 7 July 1830 and was a church clergyman in Skärstad Church until his death. His brother was the Swedish politician Ludvig Almqvist.

Bibliography
 The Variis Reipublic Suio-Gothic Raining Formula, Disquisitio Historica, Etc British Library, Historical Print Editions 
 Försök att bevisa öfverensstämmelsen emellan lutherska kyrkans symboliska böcker eller Ett annat svar på frågan: hvilken är Sveriges religion? 1827 Stockholm, Bernh. Magn. Bredberg.
 Tal vid hof-destillatoren herr Abraham Bergs begrafning i Storkyrkans grafchor, 1829 (Stockholm, published by P.A. Norstedt & söner)
 Öfver nya katekesen, i und. Förslag till allmän granskning utgifven 1873

References

Swedish theologians
1799 births
1873 deaths
19th-century Protestant theologians
19th-century Lutherans